The term Da'i al-Mutlaq (pl.) literally meaning 'the absolute, or unrestricted, missionary', is the most senior spiritual rank and office in Tayyibi Isma'ilism. The Da'i al-Mutlaq has headed the Tayyibi community since the seclusion of the 21st Tayyibi Imam, at-Tayyib Abu'l-Qasim, traditionally placed in 528 AH/1134 AD. 

According to Tayyibi Isma'ili tradition, in the Imam's absence, the Da'i al-Mutlaq is the faith's highest authority; i.e., the Da'i al-Mutlaq holds the same authority as the Imam. Before the seclusion of al-Tayyib, the Da'i al-Mutlaq operated under the direct orders of the Imam and his trusted associates in regions where Isma'ili faithful were present, either living openly propounding their faith, or secretly due to fear of persecution.

In Yemen, after the seclusion of the Imam, the Da'i was given the authority of Itlaaq (إطلاق), or free conduct, and absolute religious and social authority, under the governing principles of the Tayyibi Isma'ili faith. His command is regarded as a final decree guided by the divine support of the Imam. Unlike the Imam, who appoints his successor only from his sons (with one exception), the Da'i can appoint anyone as his successor whom he deems trustworthy, pious, and capable of conducting Da'wah (missionary) affairs with wisdom and proficiency.

History

According to Ismā'īlī [Musta'ali Tayyabī]  tradition, before the 21st Fatimid [Musta'ali] Imam, Taiyab abi al-Qasim went into state of occultation from Cairo in 528 AH/1134 AD, his father, the 20th Imām al-Amīr had instructed Queen Arwa al-Sulayhi/Al-Hurra Al-Malika in Yemen to anoint a vicegerent after the occultation of his son al-Tayyib Abu'l-Qasim. Queen Arwa trained and appointed Syedna Zoeb bin Moosa as the first Da'i in the modern office.

The Dā'ī al-Mutlaq is recognised in English law as a corporation sole, by a private act of Parliament passed in 1993.

Tradition of Nass governing the Appointment of Saheb-i-Amar 
Nass-نص  is the basis of Shia beliefs, it ensures the succession (Silsila).  It is a declaration and designation through Divine Indication and Spiritual Intervention-تأئید إلھي for the appointment of a successor-منصوص, be it an Imam or his deputy-داعي during Imam's concealment by his predecessor-ناص amongst his subjects, publicly-نص جلي or privately نص خفي and at times supported by written documentary orders-سجل شریف.  This tradition and practice-سنۃ اللہ is related to the Isma’ili Taiyebi succession to the seat of Imaamat, whereby each Imam under hidden heavenly commands designates his successor, when he witnesses the Light of Imaamat-نور الإمامۃ has got transferred to one of his batini (in essence) sons not necessarily in the Jismani (blood) relations whom he selects for Nass.  The one who appoints is called Naas and the one appointed is called Mansoos, here Mansoos is batini (in essence) son and Naass is batini father, irrespective of their Jismani (blood) relationships, which is evident in many examples (beginning with appointment of Ali ibne Abi Taalib in Ghadire Khumm by Mohammad).  The succession (Silsila) continued from Imam to Imam to Da'i to Da'i and will continue so on and on.

The tradition stems from the events of Ghadir Khum where Mohammad appointed his son-in-law, cousin and his heir 'Ali bin Abi Taalib as his Vicegerent, legatee and Wali of the Faithful.  This tradition continued through all the Tayyibi-Ismaili Imams and Du'aat; according to Tayyibi-Ismaili belief, neither Imam nor Da'i al-Mutlaq can pass away without appointing his successor.

Deputies
The Da'i al-Mutlaq has the authority to appoint, at his discretion, a trusted individual to each of two ranks:  Mazoon al-Da'wat and Mukasir al-Da'wat.

Mazoon al-Da'wat
 المأذون الدعوة - al-Mazoon al-Da'wat, Mazoon e Dawat: The Licentiate, Authoritative Rank, the most trusted associate in Da’wah ranks whose traditional role includes taking Bay'at from his subjects by the orders of Da’i al-Mutlaq. He is on a Spiritual Rank in the Isma’ili Taiyebi Da’wah hierarchy immediately below the authority of Da’i and sits to his right, and who carries out the religious activities as per the regulations of Da’wah organization. At any cost he always assists and obeys his superior and his Master, the Da’i al-Mutlaq. In the absence of the Da’i he acts as his legatee. The Da'i al-Mutlaq's successor is often appointed to the rank of Mazoon; however, this is not the rule and the Da'i's successor has often been someone other than the Mazoon. Upon the death of the Mazoon, the Da'i selects a new trusted associate to fill the position.

Mukaasir al-Da'wat
 المکاسر الدعوة - al-Mukaasir al-Da'wat, Mukaasir e Dawat - The second deputy rank to the Da'i proscribed in Isma’ili Taiyebism.[38] He sits to the right of the Mazoon during religious gatherings (Majalis).  In the absence of both the Da'i and Mazoon, the Mukaasir acts as their legatee. Upon the death of the Mazoon, the Da'i selects a new trusted associate to fill the position.

Incumbents
Since the establishment of the office of Da'i al-Mutlaq following the death of the Fatimid Caliph-Imam Mansur al-Amir Bi-Ahkamillah, there have been several disputes over the succession to the office, leading to a number of extant sects, each with their own incumbent to the office.

Dawoodi Bohras 

The Dawoodi Bohras are the largest community of Tayyibi Ismailis, who followed Dawood Bin Qutubshah Burhan al-Din II as the successor to Da'ud Burhan al-Din I, thus deriving their name from him.

Within the Dawoodi Bohras, the current Da'i al-Mutlaq is Mufaddal Saifuddin.  The last Da'i was Syedna Mohammed Burhanuddin, who died in 2014.  The vast majority of Dawoodi Bohras recognize Saifuddin as the 53rd incumbent.

The current seat of the Dawoodi Bohra Da'i is in Mumbai, India.

Alavi Bohras 

The Alavi Bohras are a smaller group of Tayyibi Ismailis, who followed Ali Shams al-Din V as the successor to Sheikh Adam Safiuddin, thus deriving their name from him.

The Alavi Bohras use the title of Dai al-Mutlaq in its Persian form "Da'i-e-Mutlaq".  The current incumbent is Haatim Zakiyuddin, who succeeded his father Abu Hatim Tayyib Ziyauddin in 2015.

The current seat of the Alavi Bohra Da'i is in Vadodara, India.

Sulaymanis 
The Sulaymanis are a smaller group of Tayyibi Ismailis, who followed Sulayman bin Hassan as the successor to Da'ud Burhan al-Din, thus deriving their name from him.

Starting from 1677, Sulayman's successors almost always came from the Makrami family. The Sulaymani Du'at made Najran their headquarters and ruled the area, supported by the Banu Yam, until their power waned under the successive rules of the Ottomans and Saudis.

The current seat of the Sulaymani Da'i is in Najran, Saudi Arabia.

The current incumbent is Mohsin bin Ali al-Makrami.

Atba-e-Malak Badar 
The Atba-i-Malak community are a branch of Musta'ali Isma'ili Shi'a Islam that broke off from the mainstream Dawoodi Bohra after the death of the 46th Da'i al-Mutlaq, under the leadership of Abdul Hussain Jivaji in 1840. They have further split into two more branches. The Atba-e-Malak Badar is a branch of Atba-e-Malak Mustaali Ismaili Shi'a Islam. They follow the preachings of both Abdul Hussein Jivaji and Badruddin Ghulam Hussain Miya Khan Saheb who was appointed as Hijab (Veil) of Moulana Malak (Abdul Hussein Jivaji) Saheb. The current leader or Dai al Mutlaq is Maulana Muhammad Amiruddin Malak Saheb. The Atba-i-Malak Badar community is based in Mahdibagh, Nagpur in India. The Mahdibagh Atba-i-Malak Badar community, is a unique community of peaceful and progressive Muslims, an elitist sect, known as Atba-e-Malak Badar (followers of Maulana Malak and Maulana Badar) founded in 1899 AD in Nagpur, India.

Atba-e-Malak Vakil (Muslim-Shia-Ismaili-Tayyebi-Dawoodi-Malak-Vakil Bohra) 
The Atba-e-Malak Vakil continues the tradition of Nass after the untimely demise of the 46th Da'i al-Mutlaq Syedna Mohammad Badruddin saheb.  The Amar passes on to four Mumalikin saheb (hidden successors - the seclusion was necessary to guard the Amar in then difficult times), last one being Moulana Adamji Tayyebji saheb in Mumbai followed by Moulana Malak (Abdul Hussein Jivaji) saheb who appointed Moulana Abdul Qadir Ebrahimji saheb as his Mansoos (successor) or Vakil (the one who advocates his succession or roots / acts for his principal) that identifies his followers as Atba-e-Malak Vakil.  Their current spiritual lord / Imam is Moulana Tayyeb saheb bin Moulana Razzak saheb.  This is a very small and peaceful community with high moral and ethical values, the majority of its population is in Nagpur in India with the second largest population is in Mumbai.  Qur'an and Nasihat (Scriptures written by Syedi Sadiqali during the period of 42nd Da'i al-Mutlaq Syedna Yusuf Najmuddin saheb and 44th Da'i al-Mutlaq Syedna Mohammed Ezzuddin saheb) are main religious scriptures of Atba-e-Malak Vakil sect.

Qutbi Bohra 
Taher Fakhruddin is a claimant  to the title of 54th Da'i al-Mutlaq of the Dawoodi Bohras, a sect within Shia Islam. He is the oldest son of Khuzaima Qutbuddin, claimant to the position of 53rd Da'i al-Mutlaq. After the death of the 52nd Da'i al-Mutlaq, Syedna Mohammed Burhanuddin. Khuzaima Qutbuddin died on 30 March 2016. On 31 March 2016 the family of Qutbuddin released a statement that "Khuzaima Qutbuddin has conferred nass (announcement of successor) on his son Taher Fakhruddin". Followers of Qutbuddin regard Fakhruddin as a rightly appointed Da'i al-Mutlaq whereas followers of Syedna Mufaddal Saifuddin do not recognise him as the Da'i al-Mutlaq.

One of Taher Fakhruddin's first major decision was regarding the burial arrangements of his father and predecessor in office, Khuzaima Qutbuddin, who died on 30 March 2016. It was decided to bring Qutbuddin's body to India for burial.  Qutbuddin was buried at his residence Darus Sakina in Thane on 10 April 2016, after it was arranged for his body to make an overflight circumambulating Raudat Tahera by helicopter in order to pay respects at the mausoleum of his father, the 51st Dai Syedna Taher Saifuddin and the 52nd Dai Syedna Mohammed Burhanuddin his predecessor and his half-brother.

Khuzaima Qutbuddin had filed a case at the Bombay High Court against Syedna Mufaddal Saifuddin in 2014 alleging that only Qutbuddin had received a valid appointment of succession from Syedna Burhanuddin. Taher Fakhruddin has continued his father's efforts against Syedna Mufaddal Saifuddin at the Bombay High Court.

See also 

 List of Dai of Dawoodi Bohra
 Alavi Bohras
 Succession to 52nd Dai al-Mutlaq

References

External links 
 Dawoodi Bohra Da'i al-Mutlaq, Mazoon, and Mukasir
 Community Website of Alavi Bohras

Bohra
Tayyibi Isma'ilism
Alavi Bohras
Islamic honorifics
Ismaili da'is